Platyptilia celidotus is a species of moth in the family Pterophoroidea. This species was described by Edward Meyrick in 1885 and named Lioptilus celidotus. It has been found in both New Zealand and Australia.

References

celidotus
Moths of New Zealand
Moths described in 1885